The first annual Soap Opera Digest Awards were held in 1984, with the second being screened on NBC and Days of Our Lives winning every award in the daytime categories. For the subsequent six years votes were for awards in either daytime soaps, or primetime (with editor awards being for either). From the 9th event onwards votes were across both types of shows.

Key

Awards dedicated to daytime

United awards

Notes

References

1984 television awards
01
2005 television awards
2003 television awards
2001 television awards
2000 television awards
1999 television awards
1998 television awards
1997 television awards
1996 television awards
1995 television awards
1994 television awards
1993 television awards
1992 television awards
1991 television awards
1990 television awards
1989 television awards
1988 television awards
1986 television awards
1985 television awards
Soap opera lists